Ghost Town Prophecy is a 2007 album/EP by Canadian/Ghanaian Musician Kae Sun.

Track listing

 "Where Did Everybody Go"  – 3:44
 "Kidnapped"  – 3:38
 "Stay Up"  – 3:52
 "Metropolis"  – 2:54
 "Living In The City"  – 3:38
 "Angels By Day"  – 4:37

Note that "Metropolis" was originally titled "Shivaree", written by What the Thunder Said and adapted by Kae Sun.

Kae Sun albums
2007 albums